Fecht may refer to:

People
Hans-Jörg Fecht (born 1957), German scientist
Özay Fecht (born 1953), Turkish-German actress and jazz singer
Petrus Michaelis Fecht (died 1576), Swedish theologian

Places
Fecht (river), a tributary of the Ill in northeastern France